Events in the year 1925 in China.

Incumbents
President: Duan Qirui
Premier: Xu Shiying (from 26 December)

Events
 January – Election of the 4th Central Bureau of the Chinese Communist Party
 11 February – Establishment of the Prefecture Apostolic of Tsingtao
 1 May – Establishment of the All-China Federation of Trade Unions
 30 May – Beginning of the May Thirtieth Movement
 June – Start of the Canton–Hong Kong strike
 November – Start of the Anti-Fengtian War
 Establishment of the 4th Central Executive Committee of the Chinese Communist Party
 Establishment of the National Revolutionary Army

Undated
Changzhou No.1 High School is established

Births
13 July – Huang Zongying, Chinese actress (died 2020).
9 August – Anna Hannevik, Chinese-born Norwegian Salvation Army officer.
2 November – Zhang Youshang, biochemist (died 2022).
18 November – Peng Shilu, nuclear engineer (died 2021).

References

 
1920s in China
Years of the 20th century in China